The Ambassador of Russia to Rwanda is the official representative of the President and the Government of the Russian Federation to the President and the Government of Rwanda.

The ambassador and her staff work at large in the Russian embassy in Kigali.

History of diplomatic relations

Following a series of events, including the Rwandan Revolution in 1959 and the 1961 Rwandan monarchy referendum, culminating in a Rwandan declaration of independence in 1962, the Soviet Union moved to establish relations with the new state. The two countries agreed to exchange ambassadors on 17 October 1963, and the first Soviet ambassador to Rwanda, was appointed on 1 November 1966, and presented his credentials on 4 January 1967. With the dissolution of the Soviet Union in 1991, the incumbent Soviet ambassador, continued as a representative of the Russian Federation until 1994.

List of representatives (1966- present)

Representatives of the Soviet Union to Rwanda (1966-1991)

Representatives of the Russian Federation to Rwanda (1991-present)

References 

 
Rwanda
Russia